José Aponte de la Torre Airport  is a public use airport owned by Puerto Rico Ports Authority and located  from  Ceiba, a coastal town in Puerto Rico. It is included in the National Plan of Integrated Airport Systems for 2011–2015, which categorized it as a general aviation airport. The airport also offers scheduled passenger service via three commercial airlines to the islands of Vieques and  Culebra, Puerto Rico.

The airport opened in November 2008 on the site of the former Roosevelt Roads Naval Station, replacing the Diego Jiménez Torres Airport  in Fajardo. The airport was used as a testing site for Google Loon, a project to deliver high-speed internet using high-altitude balloons.

Facilities
There is also a closed runway designated 18/36 which measures .

The Roosevelt Roads TACAN (Ident: NRR) is located on the field.

American Airlines donated  an MD-82 to the Puerto Rico Aviation Maintenance Institute (PRAMI) mechanics school located at the airport, which sits on closed runway 18/36.

Airlines and destinations

Passenger

M&N Aviation operates charter flights.

See also

 List of airports in Puerto Rico
 Transportation in Puerto Rico

References

External links
 
 
 OpenStreetMap - Ceiba Airport
 SkyVector - Jose Aponte de la Torre Airport

Airports in Puerto Rico
Ceiba, Puerto Rico
Airports established in 2008